Ivor Evans may refer to:

 Ivor Evans (footballer, born 1966), Fijian football midfielder
 Ivor Evans (Australian footballer) (1887–1960), Australian rules footballer
 Ivor Parry Evans (1923–2009), United States Air Force officer
 Ivor William Evans (1887–1960), co-designer of the Australian national flag
 I. H. N. Evans (Ivor Hugh Norman Evans, 1886–1957), British anthropologist, ethnographer and archaeologist
 Ivor Evans (opera singer, born William Ivor Evans 1911), (1911–1993), Welsh bass baritone singer

See also
 Ifor Evans (disambiguation)